Philip K. O'Neill (born 1951) is an American politician. He served as a Republican member of the Nevada Assembly from 2014 until 2016 and now has currently served in the assembly since 2020.

Early life
Philip O'Neill was born in 1951 in Washington, D.C. He was educated at the Georgetown Preparatory School in Bethesda, Maryland. He graduated from Sierra Nevada College, where he received a bachelor of science in business management.

Career
O'Neill worked in law enforcement for four decades prior to running for office. He served as a Republican member of the Nevada Assembly, where he represented District 40. He is a member of the National Rifle Association (NRA).

In 2016, O'Neill ran for reelection but was narrowly defeated by Al Kramer in the Republican primary.

Personal life
O'Neill has a wife, Nancy, and four children. They reside in Carson City, Nevada.

References

1951 births
21st-century American politicians
Living people
People from Washington, D.C.
Politicians from Carson City, Nevada
Republican Party members of the Nevada Assembly
Sierra Nevada College alumni